was a town located in Shitsuki District, Okayama Prefecture, Japan.

As of 2003, the town had an estimated population of 5,736 and a density of 71.07 persons per km2. The total area was 80.71 km2.

On March 1, 2005, Yoshii, along with the town of Bisei (from Oda District), was merged into the expanded city of Ibara.

Dissolved municipalities of Okayama Prefecture